Rentberry, Inc. is a global home rental platform based in San Francisco, USA and founded in 2015. It was highly criticized and got controversial reviews from the US press such as Vanity Fair, The Wall Street Journal, The Independent, HuffingtonPost, etc. and was involved in lawsuits against Seattle city authorities.

Overview 
Rentberry is a decentralized rental platform The users (tenants) can bid on their rent with the help of the platform. In 2015, Rentberry product prototype raised first investments from 12 international investors. The platform covered only Los Angeles and New York at that time. In 2017, the company announced partnership with ListHub, Realtor.com and Walk Score to bring together rental billboards and later raised $4.5 million.

Controversy and criticism 
The American press gave controversial reviews and called Rentberry "eBay for rent" arguing that the platform could drive up the rental market. Since the first launch, the controversial bidding tool (a tenant can set a preferred price for an apartment) has been discussed in Vanity Fair, The Wall Street Journal, The Independent, HuffingtonPost, CBS SF BayArea, SFGate, Inman, Curbed and other media.

In May 2018, Rentberry and the Pacific Legal Foundation has sued the City of Seattle for violating the rights of Seattle residents in March 2018, Seattle City Council imposed an annual moratorium on bargaining platforms like Rentberry. In March 2019, Rentberry lost the case in the US District Court.

See also 
 GuestReady
 Booking.com

References 

Companies based in San Francisco
2015 establishments
Property management companies